Eastern Township is one of twelve townships in Franklin County, Illinois. As of the 2010 census, its population was 582 and it contained 267 housing units.

Geography

Unincorporated towns
 Akin
 Akin Junction
 Bessie
 Boothby
(This list is based on USGS data and may include former settlements.)

Cemeteries
The township contains these five cemeteries: Brady, Cook, Jones, Manion and Otterson.

Major highways
  Illinois Route 34

Demographics

School districts
 Hamilton County Community Unit School District 10

Political representation
 Illinois's 12th congressional district
 State House District 117
 State Senate District 59

References
 
 United States Census Bureau 2007 TIGER/Line Shapefiles
 United States National Atlas

External links
 City-Data.com
 Illinois State Archives

Townships in Franklin County, Illinois
Townships in Illinois